Lieutenant General Sir Chandos Blair  & Bar (25 February 1919 – 22 January 2011) was a senior British Army officer who served as General Officer Commanding Scottish Command from 1972 to 1976.

Military career
Born the son of Arthur Blair and educated at Harrow School and the Royal Military College, Sandhurst, Blair was commissioned as a second lieutenant into the Seaforth Highlanders on 26 January 1939. He served in World War II with the 2nd and 7th Battalions of his regiment. Serving with the 2nd Battalion, which formed part of the 51st (Highland) Division, in 1940, the battalion was forced to surrender at Dunkirk, and he became a prisoner of war at the Oflag V-B camp at Biberach in Baden-Württemberg. He escaped to Switzerland and from there to Spain and to Gibraltar. As such he was the first officer to return home after escaping from a prisoner of war camp. Blair was awarded the Military Cross for his exploits. He later served with the 7th Battalion, Seaforths, which formed part of the 15th (Scottish) Infantry Division, and was with the battalion throughout the campaign in Northwest Europe, landing in Normandy shortly after D-Day in June 1944 and fighting until Victory in Europe Day almost exactly eleven months later.

In 1959, he was appointed commanding officer of the 4th Battalion the King's African Rifles. He was made General Officer Commanding 2nd Division in British Army of the Rhine in 1968 and then became Defence Services Secretary in 1970. His last appointment was as General Officer Commanding Scotland and Governor of Edinburgh Castle in 1972; in that capacity, Prime Minister Harold Wilson dispatched him as a Special Envoy to secure the release of Denis Hills, a British subject held on spying charges by President Idi Amin of Uganda. Blair retired in 1976.

Family
In 1947 he married Audrey Mary Travers; they went on to have one son and one daughter. His elder brother David was a useful amateur golfer and was best-man at the wedding of Chandos and Audrey.

References

|-
 

|-
 

1919 births
2011 deaths
British Army lieutenant generals
British Army personnel of World War II
British escapees
British World War II prisoners of war
Graduates of the Royal Military College, Sandhurst
King's African Rifles officers
Knights Commander of the Royal Victorian Order
Officers of the Order of the British Empire
People educated at Harrow School
Military personnel from Edinburgh
Recipients of the Military Cross
Seaforth Highlanders officers
World War II prisoners of war held by Germany